Megan Whalen Turner (born November 21, 1965) is an American writer of fantasy fiction for young adults. She is best known for her novel The Thief and its five sequels. In 1997, The Thief was named a Newbery Honor book.

Early life

Turner received her BA with honors in English language and literature from the University of Chicago in 1987. Before becoming an author, she worked as a children's book buyer for bookstores in Chicago and Washington D.C.

Career
Turner began writing a collection of short fantasy stories after moving to California in 1989. She published the stories as Instead of Three Wishes: Magical Short Stories in 1995.

Turner is best known for her series of young adult novels primarily revolving around a character named Eugenides. Turner has no official name for the series herself, sometimes referring to it as "The Geniad", but fans have coined it The Queen's Thief. The first book in the series, The Thief, won a Newbery Honor award.  The subsequent books in the series are The Queen of Attolia, The King of Attolia, A Conspiracy of Kings, Thick as Thieves, and Return of the Thief.

Turner was the 2013 Literary Guest of Honor and Keynote Speaker at the Life, the Universe, & Everything professional science fiction and fantasy arts symposium.

In July 2018, Turner announced the March 2019 publication date of Return of the Thief. This was first pushed back to spring 2020 before the book was published on October 6, 2020, concluding the series.

Her additional work includes a short story collection titled Instead of Three Wishes, and a short story, "The Baby in the Night Deposit Box", published in a collection called Firebirds, edited by Sharyn November. "The Baby in the Night Deposit Box" was selected for The Year's Best Fantasy and Horror. She has also written six uncollected short stories — "Thief!", "Destruction", "Eddis", "Knife Dance, "Wineshop", and "Alyta's Missing Earring" — which are set in the world of The Thief.

Personal life

Her husband is the cognitive scientist Mark Turner. The couple have three sons.

Bibliography 

1995 Instead of Three Wishes: Magical Short Stories
2003 Firebirds (contribution)

The Queen's Thief

1996 The Thief
2000 The Queen of Attolia
2006 The King of Attolia
2010 A Conspiracy of Kings
2017 Thick as Thieves
2020 Return of the Thief

References

External links

1965 births
Living people
20th-century American novelists
21st-century American novelists
American children's writers
American fantasy writers
American women short story writers
American women novelists
Newbery Honor winners
University of Chicago alumni
American women children's writers
Women science fiction and fantasy writers
20th-century American women writers
21st-century American women writers
20th-century American short story writers
21st-century American short story writers
People from Fort Sill, Oklahoma
Writers from Cleveland
Novelists from Oklahoma
Novelists from Ohio